John Harmer served as mayor of Williamsburg, Virginia from 1737 to 1738.

Harmer was mayor of Williamsburg in 1738 and 1746, a churchwarden for Bruton Parish Church, and Burgess for Williamsburg from 1742 to 1747. He also served as a justice of the York County Court.

Notes

References
 Tyler, Lyon Gardiner, ed. Encyclopedia of Virginia Biography. Volume 1. New York: Lewis Historical Publishing Company, 1915. . Retrieved July 15, 2011.

Mayors of Williamsburg, Virginia